Central University of Kashmir (often abbreviated as cukashmir), formerly Central University of Jammu and Kashmir, is a central university located in the Ganderbal district of Jammu and Kashmir, India. It has been established in March 2009 through an Act of Parliament, "The Central Universities Act, 2009" by Govt. of India. The university started functioning from May 2009.

Academics
The Central University of Kashmir offers a three-year bachelor's degree programme in vocational studies (BVoc), a five-year integrated bachelor's degree programme in arts and laws (BA-LLB), five-year integrated bachelor's and master's degree programmes (BSc-MSc) in biotechnology, mathematics, physics and zoology, a three-year integrated bachelor's and master's degree programme in Education (BEd-MEd) and postgraduate programmes, including LLM, MA, MBA, MCom, MSc, MTech and MTTM. These programmes are offered through different academic departments. At present, the available disciplines are Biotechnology, Business Administration, Commerce, Comparative Religion, Computer Science, Convergent Journalism, Economics, Education, English, Information Technology, Islamic Studies, Law, Mathematics, Physical Education, Physics, Political Science, Teacher Education, Travel and Tourism Management, Urdu, Vocational Studies (in two branches: 1. Retail and Logistic Management & 2. Tourism and Hospitality Management), and Zoology. In addition, research programmes like integrated MPhil-PhD programme in Biotechnology, Economics, Education, English, Journalism, Management Studies, Mathematics, Political Science, Religious Studies, Tourism Studies, and Urdu and direct PhD programme in Law along with few PG diploma programmes (in Guidance and Counselling, Peace and Conflict Studies, and Alternate Banking) are also offered by the university.

Campus 
The Central University of Kashmir earlier started its operation from rented accommodations in Hyderpora, Nowgam, Sonwar areas of Srinagar district. It started shifting to its originally allotted district Ganderbal in 2018 and was completely shifted to Ganderbal in 2019. 

The university currently operates from four campuses in district Ganderbal: Green Campus at Duderhama, Science Campus at Nunar, Science and Arts Campus at Old Hospital Building, Ganderbal, and Main Campus at Tulmulla. 

The main campus at Tulmulla is distributed over a large area of more than 500 acres of land. However, many of its buildings are under construction.

Organisation and administration

Governance
The President of India is the Visitor of the University. The Chancellor is the ceremonial head of the university while the executive powers rest with the Vice-chancellor. The Court, the Executive Council, the Academic Council, the Board of studies and the Finance Committee are the administrative authorities of the university.

The University Court is the supreme authority of the university and has the power to review, the broad policies and programmes of the university and to suggest measures for the improvement and development of the university; The Executive Council is the highest executive body of the university. The Academic Council is the highest academic body of the university and is responsible for the  co-ordination and exercising general supervision over the academic policies of the university. It has the right to advise the Executive Council on all academic matters. The Finance Committee is responsible for recommending financial policies, goals, and budgets.

Chancellors of the University

 Dr. Srikumar Banerjee (2012-2017)
 Lt. General Syed Ata Hasnain (Incumbent)

Vice-Chancellors of the University

 Prof. Abdul Wahid Qureshi (2009-2014)
 Prof. Mehraj-ud-Din Mir (2014-2021)
 Prof. Farooq Ahmad Shah (Incumbent officiating)

Schools and centres 
The university comprises the following schools and centres:

 School of Business Studies

 Department of Commerce
 Department of Management Studies
 Department of Tourism Studies

 School of Education

 Department of Education
 Department of Physical Education

 School of Engineering & Technology

 Department of Information Technology

 School of Languages

 Department of English 
 Department of Kashmiri 
 Department of Urdu

 School of Legal Studies

 Department of Law

a. Dr. B.R. Ambedkar Multidisciplinary Research Centre for Law, Public Policy and Social Action

b. Centre for Public Interest Litigation and Legal Aid

 School of Life Sciences

 Department of Animal Sciences (Zoology)
 Department of Botany
 Department of Biotechnology

 School of Media Studies

 Department of Convergent Journalism

 School of Physical & Chemical Sciences

 Department of Chemistry
 Department of Mathematics
 Department of Physics 

 School of Social Sciences

 Department of Economics
 Department of Politics and Governance
 Department of Religious Studies

Alumni
 Sanna Irshad Mattoo - Pulitzer prize winner

 Masrat Zahra - Anja Niedringhaus Courage in Photojournalism award winner

Other people
 Shahnaz Bashir - Novelist

See also 
 University of Kashmir
 University of Jammu
 Central University of Jammu
 Cluster University of Srinagar
 Cluster University of Jammu
 SKUAST, Jammu

References

External links
 

Central universities in India
Universities in Jammu and Kashmir
Universities and colleges in Jammu and Kashmir
2009 establishments in Jammu and Kashmir
Educational institutions established in 2009